The History of Political Economy is a journal published by Duke University Press, focusing on economics and the history of  economic thought and analysis.

References

External links
 

Quarterly journals
English-language journals
Publications established in 1969
Duke University Press academic journals